Namcha Barwa Himal, also known as Namjagbarwa syntaxis or Namjagbarwa Group Complex, is the easternmost section of the Himalaya in southeastern Tibet and northeastern India. This section spans 180 km from the headwaters of the Siyom River on the international border NE into Tibet to the canyon of the Yarlung Tsangpo (the Brahmaputra in India), where the Himalaya are said to end, although high ranges (Hengduan Mountains on China–Myanmar border) actually continue another 300 km east. 

Major peaks of this section include:

See also

 Geology of the Himalaya

References

External links

Mountain ranges of India
Mountain ranges of Tibet
Landforms of Arunachal Pradesh